Research in Nursing & Health is a peer-reviewed nursing journal covering a wide range of research that will inform the practice of nursing and other health disciplines. It is published by Wiley.

History 
The journal was established in 1978, with Cathy Somer as its founding editor-in-chief. Its current editor-in-chief is Eileen Lake (University of Pennsylvania).

Abstracting and indexing 
The journal is abstracted and indexed in:

CINAHL
Current ContentsSocial & Behavioral Sciences
EBSCO databases
MEDLINE/PubMed
PASCAL
ProQuest databases
PsycINFO
Science Citation Index Expanded
Scopus
Social Sciences Citation Index

According to the Journal Citation Reports, the journal has a 2017 impact factor of 1.762.

References

External links 

General nursing journals